The 2023 WAC men's basketball tournament is the postseason men's basketball tournament of the Western Athletic Conference (WAC) for the 2022–23 season. The conference tournament is scheduled to be played from March 7–11, 2023, at Michelob ULTRA Arena and the Orleans Arena in Paradise, Nevada near Las Vegas. The first round will be played on March 7 at Michelob ULTRA Arena with the remaining rounds March 9–11 at the Orleans Arena. The winner of the conference tournament, Grand Canyon, received the conference's automatic bid to the NCAA tournament.

Seeds
Twelve of the thirteen members will be invited to the tournament. While Tarleton and Utah Tech are ineligible for the NCAA tournament, they are eligible for the WAC tournament. New Mexico State canceled the remainder of its season on February 11, 2023 due to an ongoing investigation of hazing incidents within the program. Teams will be seeded using the WAC Resume Seeding rankings. The WAC Resume Seeding rankings are an advanced analytic developed by Ken Pomeroy that incorporates the performance of teams in both conference and non-conference games.  Rankings were initially released on December 5. While seedings are determined using the WAC Resume Seeding System, the top 12 teams that qualify for the tournament will be determined based on conference league records. Since New Mexico State suspended its season, the remaining 12 teams will participate in the tournament (as reflected in the seedings released starting with the February 13 rankings shown in the table below). Regardless of which team receives the top seed from the WAC Resume Seeding rankings, the regular season conference champion is determined based on conference win percentage.

If a team that is not eligible for the NCAA Trouament wins the WAC Tournament, the conference's automatic bid goes to the highest seeded tournament-eligible team.

Schedule

Bracket
* denotes overtime period

Awards

See also 
 2023 WAC women's basketball tournament

References

Tournament
WAC men's basketball tournament
Basketball competitions in the Las Vegas Valley
College basketball tournaments in Nevada
WAC men's basketball tournament
WAC men's basketball tournament
College sports tournaments in Nevada